The Brelsford House (also known as The Banyans) was a historic home in Palm Beach, Florida, United States, located at 1 Lake Trail.  Built between 1888 and 1903, it was added to the National Register of Historic Places on May 3, 1974.  The Neoclassical house was destroyed in August of the following year, but it remains on the Register.

The house was built for E. M. Brelsford, Palm Beach's first postmaster; it was he who applied for a post office in "Palm Beach". He also founded the first store, a general store. The money to build the house came from the sale of his Palm Beach land to Henry Flagler. Brelsford is buried in Woodlawn Cemetery in West Palm Beach.

References

External links

 Palm Beach County markers at Florida's Office of Cultural and Historical Programs

Houses on the National Register of Historic Places in Florida
National Register of Historic Places in Palm Beach County, Florida
Demolished buildings and structures in Florida
Houses completed in 1903
Houses in Palm Beach County, Florida
1903 establishments in Florida
1975 disestablishments in Florida
Neoclassical architecture in Florida
Buildings and structures demolished in 1975